A heteroduplex is a double-stranded (duplex) molecule of nucleic acid originated through the genetic recombination of single complementary strands derived from different sources, such as from different homologous chromosomes or even from different organisms. 

One such example is the heteroduplex DNA strand formed in hybridization processes, usually for biochemistry-based phylogenetic analyses.  Another is the heteroduplexes formed when non-natural analogs of nucleic acids are used to bind with nucleic acids; these heteroduplexes result from performing antisense techniques using single-stranded peptide nucleic acid, 2'-O-methyl phosphorothioate or Morpholino oligos to bind with RNA.

In meiosis, the process of crossing-over occurs between non-sister chromatids, which results in new allelic combinations in the gametes.  In crossing-over, a Spo11 enzyme makes staggered nicks in a pair of sister chromatid strands (in a tetrad organization of prophase).  Subsequent enzymes trim back the 5' ends of the strand and a protein complex binds to the 3' single-stranded ends.  Rad51 protein is recruited and binds in a protein complex to search for a complementary sequence analogous to double-strand-break repair.  The filament searches for the homologous chromosome, strand invasion occurs where the new chromosome forms a D-loop over the bottom sister chromatid, then the ends are annealed.  This process can yield double Holliday junctions that when cut in a transversal pattern by endonucleases form 2 heteroduplex strand products.

Heteroduplex DNA is also a source of small RNAs (smRNAs), causing post-transcriptional gene silencing.

DNA